Sheng He (born 1964, China) is a professor of psychology in the Department of Psychology, University of Minnesota.

He is broadly interested in the neural basis of human vision, visual attention, and visual awareness. His most influential works include the demonstration of adaptation to invisible visual patterns (such as gratings), and the depth of invisible processing during binocular suppression.

Works
 He, S., Cavanagh, P., and Intriligator, J. (1996) Attentional resolution and the locus of visual awareness. Nature, 383 334-337
 He, S. & MacLeod, D. (2001) Orientation-Selective Adaptation and Tilt Aftereffect from invisible patterns, Nature, vol. 411, 473-476
 Fang, F. & He, S. (2005) Cortical responses to invisible objects in the human dorsal and ventral pathways. Nature Neuroscience, 10, 1380–1385.

References

University of Minnesota faculty
Living people
1964 births
21st-century American psychologists
20th-century American psychologists